Lea Hansen (born 20 April 1999) is a Danish handball player who currently plays for Silkeborg-Voel KFUM.

She is also a part of Denmark's national recruit team in handball.
She also represented Denmark in the 2015 European Women's U-17 Handball Championship in Macedonia, leading to the trophy.

Achievements 
Youth World Championship:
Silver Medalist: 2016
European Youth Championship:
Winner: 2015
Junior European Championship:
Silver Medalist: 2017

References

1999 births
Living people
Danish female handball players
People from Aabenraa Municipality
Sportspeople from the Region of Southern Denmark
21st-century Danish women